Cada quién su lucha is a 1966 Mexican comedy film directed by Gilberto Martínez Solares and starring the double act Viruta y Capulina, performed by Marco Antonio Campos and Gaspar Henaine, co-starring María Duval and Baby Bell.

Cast
Marco Antonio Campos as Viruta
Gaspar Henaine as Capulina
María Duval as Lucha García
Baby Bell as Lucha Morales
Carlos Agostí as Badín Anuar
Eduardo Silvestre as Gerardo
Consuelo Monteagudo as Badín's Client
Leo Acosta as The Drummer
Nathanael León as Julián Caireles
Mario García "Harapos" as Badín's Henchman
Carlos Ruffino as Badín's Henchman
Julián de Meriche as Candy Factory Owner
Gloria Chávez as Young Lady at Party
Ramón Valdés as Badín's Henchman
Carlos Bravo y Fernández as Badín's Client

Production
Filming began on June 16, 1965 in Estudios Churubusco and in various locations of Mexico City, such as the intersection of Insurgentes and Félix Cuevas.

Reception
The film premiered on June 23, 1966 in Cine Alameda for two weeks.

References

External links

Mexican comedy films
1960s Spanish-language films
1960s Mexican films